Aksinin (masculine) or Aksinina (feminine) is a Russian surname. Notable people with the surname include:

Aleksandr Aksinin (1954–2020), Soviet sprinter
Alexander Aksinin (1949–1985), Russian-Ukrainian printmaker and painter

Russian-language surnames